In Abak, Nigeria, Holy Family College (HOFACO) is a boys' secondary school. The school was founded in 1942 by the Catholic Mission in Nigeria.

The Holy Family College, Oku-Abak, Abak L.G.A of Akwa Ibom State, was established in 1942 by Bishop James Moynagh SPS, then Catholic Bishop of Calabar Diocese, as the pioneer secondary school on Annang soil. At present, Holy Family College is fully owned, managed, and administered by the Catholic Diocese of Ikot Ekpene with the Most Rev. Bishop (Dr.) C.R. Umoh as her proprietor. Holy Family College runs both junior and senior secondary segments. Though fully a boarding school, a few students, for some serious reasons, are allowed by the College Administration to attend the College as day students from home. Originally founded and operated as a grammar school, Holy Family College now runs all subjects in core science, commercial and technological disciplines prescribed and recommended in the Nigerian Secondary School Curriculum of Studies. In addition, subjects such as etiquette, Latin, etc. are included in our curriculum of studies to help our students meet current global demands.

Location
The Holy Family College is located in Oku-Abak in Abak Town. It is easily accessible either from the Ikot Abai/Ukanafun Ekparakwa axis, Ikot Ekpene axis, or Uyo/Etinan axis as it is situated along the Abak-Ekparakwa Highway.

Facilities
The college has excellent boarding, social, spiritual, and academic facilities. HOFACO has several comfortable hostel blocks for accommodation; well-equipped classroom blocks; an expansive and well-furnished dining hall; regular and treated water supply; 3 standby generating plants to complement (PHCN) power supply; a solar-powered ICT Centre linked to the World Wide Web with more than 100 computer sets; a functional school bus to facilitate staff and students’ movements. With well-equipped Physics, Chemistry, Biology, Agriculture, Intro. Technology, Fine Arts, Home Economics, etc. laboratories and enough competent, well-trained, and regularly retrained teachers in all subjects and other areas of our educational endeavors, our students are sure to inherit the tradition of all-round excellence for which HOFACO is known.

Admission Policy
Admission into Holy Family College, Oku-Abak, is open to only boys who have completed their elementary education. Such prospective candidates must take and pass the Diocesan Education Commission-organized Common Entrance Examination, which is usually conducted on dates fixed by the college during the second term of the school year, with a late entrance during the early weeks of the third term. Successful candidates would then go through a screening interview, which comprises oral and written tests. Successful candidates who would have met this and other requirements are offered admission. Transferred students from other schools may be admitted into JSS1 & 2, SS1 & SS2 upon presentation of an authentic transcript and transfer certificate from previous/former schools, in addition to a written exam to be given by our school. All new candidates desiring to enter Holy Family College, in addition to all the demands listed above, have to present before admission their medical certificate of fitness from a recognized medical institution.

Examinations
Students' performance and progress are determined through periodic tests, which include continuous assessment tests and terminal examinations. Each student must take an end-of-term examination, part of which was already covered in the pre-examination tests listed above. Promotion to a new class depends on good performance in these examinations. External Examinations taken yearly by our students include:

The Junior School Certificate Examination is organized by the Akwa Ibom State Ministry of Education and WAEC NECO JAMB

In order to prepare our students for external examinations, JSS3, SS2 & 3 classes, it is the policy of the college to organize mock examinations for the above classes in addition to external competitions within and outside Akwa Ibom State.

Sport/Games
HOFACO has some of the best sporting facilities among secondary schools in Akwa Ibom State. Our students are therefore encouraged through these facilities to embrace any game of their choice with the same seriousness with which they pursue academic matters. Also, HOFACO has many trophies to show for her endeavors in the field of sports.

Houses

Moynagh House named after Bishop James Moynagh
St. Thomas
Ekanem House
St. Monica
Our Lady
Conolly House
League House
Independence House

List of Principals

Since inception, the school has been served by the following principals:
1.Rev. Fr. Hugh Connolly - 1942 – 1943
2.Rev. Fr. E. McElligot - 1943 – 1944
3.Rev.Fr. J. Gilmarten - 1945 – 1946
4.Rev. Fr. Dominic Cornway - 1946 – 1949
5.Rev. Fr. J.J. Kearns - 1949 – 1950
6.Rev. Fr. Maurice Hayes - 1951 – 1954
7.Rev. Fr. V.J. Brady - 1955 – 1963
8.Rev. Fr. J. C. McGuiness - 1963 – 1965
9.Mr. G. H. Udoh - 1965 – 1967
10.Rev. Fr. S. T. Umoh - 1968 – 1970
11.Rev. Fr. I. P. Umanah - 1971 – 1974
12.Mr. M. O. Dickson - 1975 – 1976
13.Mr. N. T. Udoumoh - 1977 - 1979
14.Mr. D. J. Usanga - 1979 – 1983
15.Mr. V. E. John - 1983 – 1984
16.Mr. D.E. Inyang - 1984 - 1985
17.Knight J. S. Etteyit (KSM) - 1985 - 1986
18.Mr. J. B. Udoh - 1986 -1989
19.Mr. C. S. Umoh - 1989 - 1991
20.Mr. A.U. Ikem - 1992 - 1995
21.Mr. Vincent N. Etuk - 1995 - 1997
22.Sir. Raphael J. Ukpong - 1998 – 1999
23.Mr. C. M. Asuka - 1999 – 2006
24.Rev. Fr. Dr. Imo Obot - 2006 - 2008
25.Rev. Fr. Cyril Udoudo - 2008 – 2010
26.Rev. Fr. Dr. Emmanuel Udoanwankwo - 2011 - 2018
27.Rev. Fr. Dr. Columbus Archibong - 2018 – till date

Notable alumni
Dominic Ekandem

Emmanuel Ukaegbu

Walter Ofonagoro

E. U. Essien-Udom

Donald Etiebet

Edidem Raymond Timothy Inyang

Emmanuel UdoUdo Ofong-Ekpe

Martin Elechi

Richard Uchechukwu Uche

External links

References

Catholic schools in Nigeria
Schools in Akwa Ibom State
Boys' schools in Nigeria
Educational institutions established in 1942
1942 establishments in Nigeria